Shri K.C. Rastogi was former Secretary-General of 9th Lok Sabha and 10th Lok Sabha and Lok Sabha Secretariat, Parliament of India. He was Secretary-General of Lok Sabha from 21 August 1990 to 31 Dec 1991.

References

External links
 https://web.archive.org/web/20110703133255/http://164.100.47.132/LssNew/members/lokprelist.aspx?lsno=9 
 https://web.archive.org/web/20110703133216/http://164.100.47.132/LssNew/members/lokprelist.aspx?lsno=10

Year of birth missing (living people)
Secretaries General of the Lok Sabha
20th-century Indian politicians
Living people
Place of birth missing (living people)